Apsectus is a genus of beetles in the family Dermestidae, containing the following species:

 Apsectus araneorum Beal, 1959
 Apsectus centralis Sharp, 1902
 Apsectus dichromus Beal, 1959
 Apsectus hispidus Melsheimer, 1844
 Apsectus hystrix Sharp, 1902
 Apsectus mexicanus (Reitter, 1881)
 Apsectus minutus Sharp, 1902
 Apsectus obscurus Sharp, 1902

References

Dermestidae genera